Grande Fratello 4 was the fourth season of Big Brother in Italy. The show was produced by Endemol and was broadcast from 22 January 2004 to 6 May 2004.

Housemates

Future Appearances
In 2012, Patrick Ray Pugliese competed in Grande Fratello 12. He had a late entry into the game but managed to reach the finale, finishing in 3rd Place.

In 2020, Patrick once again returned to compete in Grande Fratello VIP 4 and was able to reach the finale for a third time, finishing in 4th Place.

In 2022, Carolina Marconi returned to compete in Grande Fratello VIP 7.

Nominations table

Notes
: On day one, Carmen and Carolina were nominated by Big Brother. Their fellow housemates voted and Carmen was evicted.
: On day one, Ascanio and Renato entered the house and the public had to vote for one of them to evict.
: Carolina won the weekly task and chose herself to be immune from nomination.
: Domenico won the weekly task and chose Ilaria to be immune from nomination.
: Carolina won the weekly task and chose herself to be immune from nomination.
: Serena won the weekly task and chose herself to be immune from nomination.
: Ascanio won the weekly task and chose Tommaso to be immune from nomination.
: Katia won the weekly task and chose herself to be immune from nomination.
: For the final week, the public was voting for a winner, rather than to evict.

TV Ratings

References

2004 Italian television seasons
04